Crooked Tree may refer to:
 Crooked Tree, Belize, a village in Belize District, Belize
 Crooked Tree (novel), a book published in 1980
 Crooked Tree (album), a 2022 album by Molly Tuttle